Eden Cemetery is a historic African-American cemetery located in Collingdale, Pennsylvania.  It was established June 20, 1902,  and is the oldest existing black owned cemetery in the United States.  The cemetery covers about 53 acres and contains approximately 93,000 burials.

History
Jerome Bacon, an instructor at the Institute for Colored Youth (the precursor to Cheyney University), led efforts to create a cemetery for African-Americans who had been buried in cemeteries in Philadelphia that were being condemned by the city in the early 20th century.  The cemeteries included Lebanon Cemetery (condemned in 1899 – closed in 1903), the Olive Graveyard (closed in 1923), the Stephen Smith Home for the Aged and Infirm Colored Person's Burial Ground and the First African Baptist Church Burial Grounds.  The bodies buried in these cemeteries were disinterred and re-interred at Eden Cemetery. The oldest reburial in the cemetery is from 1721.

After litigation from Collingdale, Pennsylvania opposing the creation of an African-American cemetery in the township, a charter for the creation of Eden Cemetery was granted by Pennsylvania on June 20, 1902.  Fifty-three acres of land previously part of Bartram Farms were selected for the creation of the cemetery.

The first meeting of the cemetery charter committee was held on August 9, 1902, and included prominent members of Philadelphia's black community in the following roles:
 President – John C. Asbury, lawyer
 Vice-president – Charles W. Jones
 Vice-president – Daniel C. Parvis, upholsterer
 Secretary – Jerome Bacon, instructor at the Institute for Colored Youth (the precursor to Cheyney University)
 Treasurer – Martin J. Lehmann, cigar maker

The first interment at the cemetery was delayed until nightfall due to local white protestors who blocked the cemetery entrance during the day.  The headline of the Chester County Times the next day read "Collingdale Has More Race Troubles, Town Council Has No Use for a Colored Cemetery, No African Need Apply."

On May 30, 1919, a memorial was erected to commemorate the colored soldiers from Pennsylvania who fought and died in France during World War I from 1917 to 1918.

Five children victims of the 1985 MOVE bombing were interred in an unmarked grave at Eden Cemetery.

In July 2008, vandals toppled over 200 headstones in the cemetery, including that of Octavius Valentine Catto, one of the most famous burials at Eden Cemetery.

In 2010, Eden Cemetery was listed on the National Register of Historic Places.  It is still in operation and maintained by a group of volunteers.

In 2015, a monument to Pauline Oberdorfer Minor was erected in Eden Cemetery by the Philadelphia Alumnae chapter of the Delta Sigma Theta sorority She was one of the 22 founders of the Sorority but was working as a housekeeper when she died and was interred in a pauper's grave alongside three other people.

Notable burials

 Julian Abele (1881–1950), architect

 Marian Anderson (1897–1993), opera singer
 Ruth L. Bennett (1866–1947), Social reformer and first president of the Chester branch of the NAACP
 John C. Bowers (1811–1873), entrepreneur, organist, abolitionist
 John Pierre Burr (–1864), abolitionist and community leader in Philadelphia, a son of Aaron Burr
 Octavius Valentine Catto (1839–1871), civil rights leader, baseball pioneer (originally buried in Lebanon Cemetery, Philadelphia; transferred to Eden, May 14, 1903)
 Dr. Rebecca J Cole (1846–1922). Second African-American female to earn the Doctor of Medicine degree in the United States.
 Frank T. Coleman (1911–2008), educator and community volunteer
 Emilie Davis (1839–1889), diarist
 James DePreist (1936–2013), African-American orchestra conductor
 Henrietta Duterte (1817–1903), funeral home owner, philanthropist, and abolitionist
 Tyrone Everett (1953–1977), Philadelphia professional boxer
 Jessie Redmon Fauset (1882–1961), editor, poet, essayist and novelist
 James Forten (1766–1842), African-American abolitionist and businessman
 Timothy Thomas Fortune (1856–1928), journalist, civil rights leader
 Stanislaus Kostka Govern (1854–1924), West Indian–American baseball player, first manager of the Cuban Giants, labor organizer, journalist, and Shakespearean actor
 Frances Harper (1825–1911), poet, abolitionist
 Francis "Frank" Johnson (1792–1844) pioneering musician whose compositions foreshadowed jazz
 Absalom Jones (1746–1818), African-American abolitionist and clergyman, reinterred to St. Thomas African Episcopal Church in Philadelphia, Pennsylvania
 Caroline LeCount (1846–1923), civil rights activist and educator
 Harry McGilberry (1950–2006), R&B and Soul singer

 Pauline Oberdorfer Minor (1885–1963) a Founder of Delta Sigma Theta sorority
 John Bunyan Reeve (1831–1916), Presbyterian minister and professor at Howard University
 Robert Penn (1872–1912), Spanish–American War Medal of Honor Recipient
 William Still (1821–1902), abolitionist
 John Baxter Taylor, Jr. (1882–1908), track and field athlete, first African-American Olympic Gold Medalist
 Hannah Archer Till (c. 1721–1826), personal cook of George Washington and Gilbert du Motier, Marquis de Lafayette during the American Revolutionary War.

 Charles Albert Tindley (1851–1933), minister, composer
 George Henry White (1852–1918), US Congressman from North Carolina

References
Citations

Sources

External links

 
 Article at PhillyGraves.com
 YouTube Video – "Bury Me In A Free Land" – The Story of Eden Cemetery
 Philadelphia Area Archives Research Portal (PAARP) – Eden Cemetery interment records

1902 establishments in Pennsylvania
African-American cemeteries in Pennsylvania
African-American history of Pennsylvania
Cemeteries established in the 1900s
Cemeteries in Delaware County, Pennsylvania
Cemeteries on the National Register of Historic Places in Pennsylvania
Cemetery vandalism and desecration
Mass graves
National Register of Historic Places in Delaware County, Pennsylvania